Villages du Lac de Paladru is a commune in the department of Isère, southeastern France. The municipality was established on 1 January 2017 by merger of the former communes of Paladru (the seat) and Le Pin.

See also 
Communes of the Isère department

References 

Communes of Isère